Noam Yacoov (born October 20, 2004) is an Israeli–Danish professional basketball player for Hapoel Jerusalem of the Israeli Basketball Premier League.

Early years
Yacoov was born in Denmark to a Danish mother and a Israeli-Jewish father he was raised in Denmark. in July 2018, at the age of 13, he immigrated to Israel without his parents. in Israel he resides in HaOgen where his grandparents live.

Professional career
on July 5, 2021, Yacoov signed a contract with ASVEL Basket of the LNB Pro A and the EuroLeague. On September 13, 2022, Yacoov made his debut for the team, recording 11 points, 8 assists and 7 rebounds.

on January 4, 2023, Yacoov was loand to  Hapoel Jerusalem until the end of 2022–23 season.

Israeli national team career
On 24 February 2023, Yacoov made his debut for the Israeli senior national team, in an 95–97 loss against Finland, recording 12 points and 2 assists.

References

Hapoel Jerusalem B.C. players
ASVEL Basket players
2004 births
Israeli men's basketball players
Living people